Rose Crest is a summit (ca. 2000 m) at the south end of Wendler Spur in the Apocalypse Peaks of Victoria Land. The feature stands between the head of Albert Valley and Papitashvili Valley and was named by the New Zealand Geographic Board (2005) after Geoffrey (Toby) Rose, leader of a party that investigated coal measures in the Mount Bastion and Sponsors Peak area, 1984–85.

References

Mountains of Victoria Land